Jussi Halme (born August 24, 1980) is a Finnish former professional ice hockey defenceman.

Halme played in the Liiga for Tappara, Blues, SaiPa and JYP.

Career statistics

References

External links

1980 births
Living people
Denver Pioneers men's ice hockey players
Espoo Blues players
Finnish ice hockey defencemen
JYP Jyväskylä players
KooKoo players
Lempäälän Kisa players
NCAA men's ice hockey national champions
People from Nokia, Finland
SaiPa players
Södertälje SK players
Tappara players
Vaasan Sport players
Sportspeople from Pirkanmaa